Iceland is heavily integrated into the European Union via the Agreement on the European Economic Area and the Schengen Agreement, despite its status as a non-EU member state. Iceland applied for membership in 2009 but the application was controversial and the Minister of Foreign Affairs sent a letter in 2015 ending the application process.

Comparison

Integration 

Iceland is a member of the European Free Trade Association (EFTA), a grouping of four non-EU European countries, and is also part of the European Economic Area (EEA). Through the EEA, Iceland participates with a non-voting status in certain EU agencies and programmes, including enterprise, environment, education (including the Erasmus Programme) and research programs. Iceland also contributes funds to "social and economic cohesion" in the EU/EEA. Iceland also frequently consults the EU on foreign affairs and frequently aligns itself to EU foreign policy. Iceland also participates in EU civilian peacekeeping missions.

Iceland is a member of the Nordic Passport Union and the Schengen Area, which now is under EU law, as a non-voting participant. Iceland's participation in the Schengen Area allows free movement of people between Iceland and the rest of the Schengen Area. Several thousand Icelanders travel to and study or work in the EU. A large majority of foreigners in Iceland come from the EU. Iceland is also associated with the Dublin Convention on justice and home affairs cooperation. Iceland also has links to several EU member states through its membership of the Nordic Council.

Use of the euro
During the 2008–2011 Icelandic financial crisis, instability in the Icelandic króna led to discussion in Iceland about adopting the euro. However, Jürgen Stark, a Member of the Executive Board of the European Central Bank, has stated that "Iceland would not be able to adopt the EU currency without first becoming a member of the EU". As of the ECB's May 2012 convergence report, Iceland did not meet any of the convergence criteria. One year later, the country managed to comply with the deficit criteria and had begun to decrease its debt-to-GDP ratio, but still suffered from elevated HICP inflation and long-term governmental interest rates.

Explanations for Iceland's non-membership of the European Union 
Academics have proposed several explanations for why Iceland has not joined the European Union:
 The importance of the fishing industry to Iceland's economy and the perception that EU membership (and its Common Fisheries Policy) will have an adverse effect on the fishing industry.
 The perception that EU membership will have an adverse effect on Iceland's agricultural sector.
 Iceland's strong ties with the United States, which included significant economic, diplomatic and military assistance, decreased Iceland's dependence on European countries. 
 The victories in the Cod Wars may have strengthened Icelandic nationalism and boosted the perception that Iceland can succeed through unilateral or bilateral means rather than compromise in multilateral frameworks.
 The Icelandic electoral system favors rural areas, which are more eurosceptic.
 The tendency for Icelandic elites to pursue education in the United States or eurosceptic European countries (such as the United Kingdom or the Nordic countries), and to cooperate more closely with political elites from those countries.
 Icelandic nationalism and the legacy of Iceland's past as a colonial entity.
 The impact of the Icesave dispute with the Netherlands and the UK.

Trade relations

Economic relations between Iceland and the European Union are primarily governed by two agreements: a bilateral free trade agreement signed in 1972, and the agreement on the EEA in 1994. The EEA was established to give Iceland, among other European countries outside the EU, access to the EU market. Iceland's access to the EU market in respect of agriculture and fisheries is dealt with by separate bilateral agreements. Iceland is legally bound to implement into its own law all EU directives applicable to the free movement of goods, persons, services and capital. This is complemented by regular meetings between EU and Icelandic officials, including a twice-yearly meeting of EEA foreign ministers.

78% of Iceland's exports went to the EU and 52% of Iceland's imports came from it, making the EU Iceland's most important trading partner, followed by Norway. Traditionally, Iceland's economy has focused on fisheries and renewable energy, but it has been diversifying into aluminium production, pharmaceuticals, information technologies, tourism and the financial sector. Iceland is still a large exporter of fish (the third largest exporter to the EU after Norway and China) with a world trade surplus of €1.1 billion in 2008. In fisheries, the EU had a 2009 trade deficit of €879 million. Until Iceland's 2009 financial crisis, its commercial services sector had been growing rapidly, accounting for almost 35% of total exports (goods and services combined).

EU membership

Iceland applied to join the European Union on 16 July 2009 and formal negotiations began on 27 July 2010.  However, on 13 September 2013 the Government of Iceland dissolved its accession team and suspended its application to join the EU. On 12 March 2015, Foreign Minister of Iceland Gunnar Bragi Sveinsson stated that he had sent a letter to the EU withdrawing the application for membership, without the approval of the Althing, though the European Union stated that Iceland had not formally withdrawn the application.

If negotiations were to resume, Iceland would face controversial issues on fisheries which could potentially derail an agreement, despite already being a member of the European Economic Area (which excludes fishery). If an agreement were to be concluded, the accession treaty would be subject to a national referendum in Iceland and require ratification by every EU state.

Pre-2008 opinion

From 1995 to 2007 the government coalition of the conservative Independence Party (Sjálfstæðisflokkurinn) and the conservative Progressive Party (Framsóknarflokkurinn), opposed joining the EU, while the opposition Social Democratic Alliance (Samfylkingin) supported membership negotiations. In 1994, the Social Democratic Party (Alþýðuflokkurinn) became the first Icelandic political party to include the intention to apply to join the EU in its policy statement. Despite this hostility towards EU membership, the Independence Party was forced to accept some of the constraints associated with participation in the European project. Iceland sought shelter provided by the EEA, EFTA and Schengen because non-membership of the EEA and EFTA would have threatened its key economic interests, and non-membership of Schengen would have imposed burdens on Icelandic individuals.

Former Prime Minister Halldór Ásgrímsson predicted on 8 February 2006 that the country would join the EU by 2015. He added that the decisive factor would be the future and the size of the Eurozone, especially whether Denmark, Sweden and the UK would have adopted the euro or not. His prediction received some criticism, not the least from people within his own government.

Another former Prime Minister, Geir H. Haarde, has on a number of occasions stated his opposition to EU membership, both as Foreign Minister under Halldór Ásgrímsson and after taking office as Prime Minister. In response to Halldór Ásgrímsson's earlier prediction, Haarde said, "I don't share that point of view. Our policy is not to join in the foreseeable future. We are not even exploring membership." In a speech at a conference at the University of Iceland on 31 March 2006, Geir Haarde repeated what he had said on a number of occasions—that no special Icelandic interests demanded membership of the EU. In the same speech he further explained in detail why it would not be in the interest of Iceland to adopt the euro.

Following the 2007 election, the Independence Party and the Social Democratic Alliance formed a new coalition with a policy of not applying for membership, but setting up a special committee to monitor the development within the EU and suggest ways to respond to that.

Due to Iceland's limited currency, the government has explored the possibility of adopting the euro without joining the European Union. The EU, however, says that Iceland cannot join the Economic and Monetary Union (EMU) without becoming a full EU member state (all other non-EU states that use the euro do so because they previously used a member state currency that was replaced by the euro).

Effect of 2008 financial crisis

At a meeting of members of his party on 17 May 2008, Geir Haarde said that in his opinion the cost of joining the EU outweighed the benefits, and therefore he was not in favour of membership. However, in October 2008, during talks to repatriate a portion of Iceland's foreign invested pension funds—Iceland having been particularly hard hit by the financial crisis of September 2008—the unions demanded that Iceland apply for EU membership in return for wage restraint.

On 30 October 2008, Þorgerður Katrín Gunnarsdóttir, minister of education, said that "Iceland has to define its long-term national interests and part of that is a revision of the currency regime, including a possible EU application" and that an application for membership needed to be discussed "in weeks rather than months".

Two weeks later, on 17 November 2008, the Independence Party announced it would hold its party congress in January 2009 instead of Autumn 2009, to reconsider the possibility of applying for EU membership; the Progressive Party also announced it would hold its party congress in January, after two anti-EU MPs (including the party leader) resigned and were replaced by MPs more positive towards EU application.

The Progressive Party accepted at its congress to support application for EU membership but with very strict conditions including one demanding full authority for Iceland over its fishing grounds and other national resources. When the government headed by the Independence Party was dissolved in January the party decided to postpone its congress until March. The congress eventually decided on an unchanged opposition to EU membership but also claimed that if the issue were opened by others both an application and an initial accession treaty with the EU should be put to a referendum.

The US denied Iceland's financial request for financial support after the 2008 economic crash. Iceland turned to the EU for assistance, but they also turned Iceland's request for aid down. This seriously damaged the efforts of the Europhiles in Iceland to sell the EU as a shelter provider to Iceland. The Europhiles mainly focused on the potential economic benefits of EU membership and the adoption of the euro, emphasizing the benefits of cheaper goods for consumers and enterprises, and access to aid from the EU structural funds for rural areas, agriculture and the tourism industry. There was, however, no mention of the EU as a soft security shelter provider. After a speedy economic recovery and considerable domestic opposition to membership, the application was put on hold in 2013. At present, the Icelandic government does not regard the country as a candidate to join the EU, though it has not withdrawn its membership application. Iceland's membership of the European Economic Area (EEA) and Schengen provide Iceland with partial political, economic and societal shelter but it is secondary to formal membership of the EU. Iceland's membership of the EU is unlikely to materialize in the present domestic and European environment. A dramatic change is needed to alter Iceland's present European policy. Domestic features of each and every state need to be taken into consideration in order to fully understand its calculations of cost and benefits of a potential shelter relationship.

2009 election and parliamentary debate
Iceland's finance minister, Steingrímur J. Sigfússon, ahead of the country's first elections since the financial crisis, stated that "any decision for Iceland to join the European Union and the single currency must be taken by its people, not one political party", on the subject that the issue of EU membership was the greatest threat to a stable coalition.

The 2009 election, which followed the financial crisis, saw the Progressive Party switch to supporting EU membership but the Independence Party called for a referendum prior to the start of negotiations. The Social Democratic Alliance made joining the EU a key issue in their campaign.

After the win of the pro-EU Social Democratic Alliance in the election, Prime Minister Jóhanna Sigurðardóttir spoke of an immediate application to the European Union and adoption of the euro within four years as a way to deal with the country's debt.

In late April 2009, it was announced that the United Kingdom, which at the time was a member state of the European Union with whom Iceland has had a long history of fishing and territorial water disputes, supported Iceland joining the EU.

In early May 2009, it was leaked that the issue of application for EU membership would likely be left to the parliament, in which the Alliance, the Progressive Party and the Citizens' Movement together already had enough seats to approve the application. Sigmundur Davíð Gunnlaugsson, the leader of the Progressive Party, strongly objected to the suggestion that his party would assist the government in this matter, however. The anti-EU Left-Green coalition partner accepted that in spring 2010, the minister for foreign affairs would present to the parliament a bill on talks with the EU.

On 10 May 2009, Prime Minister Jóhanna Sigurðardóttir announced that the government intended to move towards membership more quickly than previously expected. She announced that a bill would be introduced in parliament on 15 May 2009, authorising the opening of accession talks with the EU. She also stated that she was confident that the legislation would pass, and that she had secured a parliamentary majority on the issue, despite the official opposition to talks by one of her coalition partners. She went on to say that she expected an official application to be submitted no later than July 2009. This seemed to leave Iceland on course to join the EU along with Croatia in 2011, as predicted by EU Enlargement Commissioner, Olli Rehn. The government has stated that the issue will be put to a vote once an accession agreement has been negotiated.

The motion to file an application for membership was officially introduced in parliament on 25 May 2009. Voting was to have been held on 13 July, but was postponed until 16 July. First, a proposal by the Independence Party to hold a referendum on the membership application was defeated by 32 to 30 with one abstention. Then the Social Democratic Alliance's proposal to apply for membership immediately was approved with a narrow majority of 33 to 28 votes with 2 abstentions.

Application for membership
To become a member, a country must first apply and then be recognised as a candidate country. For that to happen the country must satisfy the first of the Copenhagen criteria: it must be a politically stable democracy that respects human rights. Then negotiations will take place which will consider the country's fulfilment of economic criteria, the country's degree of adoption of EU legislation, and whether there shall be any exceptions.

EU Enlargement Commissioner Olli Rehn has claimed that negotiations on an accession treaty would take less than a year, because Iceland has already adopted two-thirds of EU legislation in relation to the EEA. He has on other occasions claimed that the negotiations could take up to four years.

On 30 January 2009, Rehn commented that Iceland could enter the European Union promptly in 2011, at the same time as Croatia, saying that Iceland is an old democracy but also that it should not get special treatment. Fishing quotas and Icelandic whaling may be the toughest issues in any such negotiations.

On 16 July 2009, the Althing voted in favour of accession talks with the EU (with 33 votes in favour, 28 against, and 2 abstentions). The head of the parliamentary committee on EU affairs, Árni Þór Sigurðsson, has stated that Iceland will not be ready to join the EU any earlier than 2013. However the government stated that it planned to complete negotiations by the end of 2010.

On 17 July 2009, the application for Icelandic membership of the EU was handed to the government of Sweden, which then held the presidency of the Council of the European Union, by the ambassador of Iceland in Stockholm. The application was again handed over by the Icelandic foreign minister to the Swedish one in a ceremony in Stockholm on 23 July 2009.

The letter of application was dated 16 July 2009. The application was acknowledged by the Council of the European Union on 27 July 2009.

Accession negotiations
Sweden, then holder of the EU presidency, announced that it would prioritise Iceland's EU accession process. On 24 July, the Lithuanian Parliament unanimously approved and gave full support for Iceland's membership application to join the European Union. Later, on 27 July, Malta also announced that it supports Iceland's EU bid.

In September 2009, the Spanish foreign minister visited Iceland to discuss the progress of the Icelandic application; Spain chaired the EU from January–June 2010. On 8 September, the EU commission sent a list of 2,500 questions to Iceland about its fulfilment of political and economic criteria and adoption of EU law. Iceland returned answers to them on 22 October 2009. On 2 November, Iceland selected a chief negotiator for the membership negotiations with the EU: Stefán Haukur Jóhannesson, Iceland's Ambassador to Belgium.

In January 2010 the Icesave dispute became an issue. The United Kingdom and the Netherlands want the Icelandic government to repay them the costs incurred in covering their citizens' losses due to the bankruptcy of some Icelandic banks. If Iceland does not pay, obstacles to membership could be laid by the United Kingdom and the Netherlands. If Iceland agrees to repay the UK and the Netherlands, the added debt will make it difficult to adopt the euro, a major reason for Iceland to join the EU, because of the convergence criteria. Spanish Foreign Minister Miguel Ángel Moratinos, who then held the Presidency of the European Union, has said that the Icesave dispute does not impact Iceland's application. David Miliband, then British Foreign Minister, reaffirmed the UK's continued support for Iceland's EU application. Additionally, the Dutch Foreign Minister Maxime Verhagen has stated that while the opening of negotiations will not be blocked by the Icesave dispute, it must be resolved before Iceland's accession.

In February 2010, the European Commissioner for Enlargement and European Neighbourhood Policy recommended to the Council of the European Union to start accession negotiations with Iceland. While it was expected that Iceland would be considered for official candidate status at the EU summit in March, this was delayed to allow the German national parliament, which has the authority to debate important EU policy such as enlargement before action is taken by the government, to consider the matter. The German Parliament voted in favour of opening membership negotiations on 22 April 2010. The European Council decided in June to begin negotiations, and on 17 June 2010, the EU granted official candidate status to Iceland by formally approving the opening of membership talks.

Negotiations for membership of the EU started on 27 July 2010, with screening of specific acquis chapters beginning on 15 November 2010. Iceland became eligible for pre-accession funding from the EU through the Instrument for Pre-Accession Assistance (IPA) since July 2010.

The first annual report on negotiations was published in November 2010: the main issues at stake remained the fisheries sector and whale hunting, while progress has been made concerning the Icesave dispute.

The screening process ended and formal negotiations began on 27 June 2011. Four chapters were opened: science and research; education and culture; public procurement; information society and media. The first two were immediately closed, a first in accession history. Iceland aimed to open half of the remaining chapters under the Polish presidency (the second half of 2011) and the other half under the following Danish presidency (first half of 2012). Despite disputes over Icesave and fishing, and the fact there was then no majority in favour of membership in Iceland, Icelandic Foreign Minister Össur Skarphéðinsson was confident Iceland would join and looked to the EU's flexibility in negotiations with Norway during the 1990s as hope. He did however claim that ultimately it was the major fishing countries of the EU who would influence the outcome of the application.

In February 2013, the Icelandic chief negotiator stated that the main driving force for Iceland joining the EU was the benefit to the country of adopting the euro to replace the inflation-plagued Icelandic króna. Iceland's HICP inflation and related long-term government interest rates were both recorded to be around 6 per cent on average for 2012. Most importantly, however, while the country retained the Icelandic kronur, it was unable to lift the capital controls recently introduced in the turmoil of the economic crisis. Introduction of the euro, a far stronger currency, would allow the country to lift these capital controls and achieve an increased inward flow of foreign economic capital, which ultimately would ensure higher and more stable economic growth. To be eligible to adopt the euro, Iceland would need to join the EU, as unilateral euro adoption had previously been refused by the EU.

2013 election and withdrawal of application
The Icelandic Parliamentary committee on foreign affairs tabled a proposal on 18 December 2012 to suspend accession negotiations. The motion also called for an "application referendum" to be held to determine the will of the Icelandic people prior to any resumption of negotiations. A similar proposal was submitted to the Icelandic parliament in May 2012, but was rejected by a vote of 25 for and 34 against. The Icelandic parliament had yet to vote on the new proposal, which were supported primarily at the time by the opposition Independence Party and Progressive Party. The leaders of both governing parties, the Social Democratic Alliance and Left-Green Movement, stated that they did not support the motion. However, some MPs from the Left-Green Movement declared their support for the measure. On 10 January 2013, the proposal was formally adopted by the Foreign Affairs committee.

On 14 January, the Icelandic government announced that negotiations would be slowed, and that an accession agreement would not be reached before the parliamentary election in April. No new chapters would be opened prior to the election, though negotiations would continue on chapters that had already been opened. In February 2013, the national congress of both the Independence Party and Progressive Party reconfirmed their policy that further membership negotiations with the EU should be stopped and not resumed unless they are first approved by a national referendum, while the national congresses of the Social Democratic Alliance, Bright Future and Left-Green Movement reiterated their support for the completion of EU accession negotiations.

On 19 March 2013, Þorgerður Katrín Gunnarsdóttir, an Independence Party MP, put forward a motion in the Althing calling for a referendum asking the Icelandic public whether EU accession negotiations should continue. She proposed that the referendum be held during the upcoming parliamentary election in April if possible, or else during local elections in the spring of 2014. In response to Gunnarsdóttir and other proponents of EU integration within the Independence Party, Bjarni Benediktsson, the leader of the party, reiterated the party's policy of stopping negotiations with the EU, but promised to hold a referendum on continuing the negotiations in the first half of their term if they form government.

The ruling left-wing parties suffered a major defeat in the parliamentary elections that were held on 27 April 2013, while the centrist Progressive Party had a large victory. The leaders of the Progressive Party and the Independence Party began negotiating the formation of a coalition government, and on 22 May it was announced that a coalition platform had been agreed to that would suspend all accession talks with the EU and not resume them unless approved by a referendum. However, under Icelandic law, it is not the Government but the Icelandic Parliament which decides to end negotiations. On 13 June, Iceland's Foreign Minister Gunnar Bragi Sveinsson informed the European Commission that the newly elected government intended to "put negotiations on hold". European Commission President Manuel Barroso responded on 16 July 2013 by requesting that the new Icelandic Prime Minister make a decision on the continuation of their accession bid "without further delay", and stressed that the EU remained "committed to continue the accession negotiations process, which I'm certain could address Iceland's specificities".

In August 2013 the Icelandic government revealed that it had received a legal opinion that the 2009 Parliamentary vote did not oblige it to continue accession negotiations with the EU. In light of this, the Foreign Ministry stated that it had "decided to consider dissolving the negotiation committee". A few weeks later the committee was officially dissolved. Foreign Minister Gunnar Bragi Sveinsson said that "the process has been suspended. But nothing has been closed down." In October 2013 Benediktsson stated that no decision on ending Iceland's membership bid would be made until a report being prepared by the government on negotiations and "the recent changes within the union" was completed, expected to be by the end of 2013. Benediktsson went on to say that "we will see if a proposal will be put before the parliament or not." On 12 March 2015, Foreign Minister of Iceland Gunnar Bragi Sveinsson stated that he had sent a letter to the EU withdrawing the application for membership, without the approval of the Althing, though the European Union stated that Iceland had not formally withdrawn the application.

In 2017, Iceland's newly elected government announced that it would hold a vote in parliament on whether to hold a referendum on resuming EU membership negotiations. However, in November 2017 that government was replaced by a coalition of the Independence Party, the Left Green Movement and the Progressive Party; all of whom oppose membership. Only 11 out of 63 MPs are in favour of EU membership.

There was a renewed call in 2022 for a referendum on resuming EU membership negotiations.

Timeline
EU affiliation ahead of membership application
1970-01-01: Iceland joins EFTA.
1992-05-02: Iceland signs EU Association Agreement (entering the EEA).
1994-01-01: EU Association Agreement entry into force.
2001-03-25: Iceland joins the Schengen Area.

EU membership application and the preparational phase
2009-07-17: Iceland submits EU membership application.
2009-09-08: European Commission presents legislative questionnaire to Iceland.
2009-10-22: Iceland responds to questionnaire.
2010-02-24: European Commission recommended that the Council open accession negotiations with Iceland.
2010-06-17: Iceland officially recognised as an accession candidate by the European Council.
2010-07-26: The Council approved the framework for accession negotiations with Iceland.
2010-07-27: Preparational phase of the membership negotiation process starts (Accession Conference nr.1).
2010-11-15: Screening process started.
2011-06-21: Screening process ended.

EU membership negotiations
2011-06-27: Accession Conference nr.2. Real negotiations started with the first four chapters being opened, of which two were completed and closed on the same day.
2011-10-19: Accession Conference nr.3. Two chapters were opened and closed immediately. In total 6 out of 33 chapters have now been opened (of which 4 have been closed).
2011-12-12: Accession Conference nr.4. Five chapters were opened, four were closed immediately. In total 11 out of 33 chapters have now been opened (of which 8 have been closed).
2012-03-30: Accession Conference nr.5. Four chapters were opened and two chapters were closed. In total 15 out of 33 chapters have now been opened (of which 10 have been closed).
2012-05-24: Proposal for a national referendum on discontinuing accession talks with the European Union rejected with 34 votes against and 25 in favour.
2012-06-22: Accession Conference nr.6. Three new chapters opened. In total 18 out of 33 chapters have now been opened (of which 10 have been closed).
2012-10-24: Accession Conference nr.7. Three new chapters opened. In total 21 out of 33 chapters have now been opened (of which 10 have been closed).
2012-12-18: Accession Conference nr.8. Six new chapters opened and one more chapter closed. In total 27 out of 33 chapters have now been opened (of which 11 have been closed).

Negotiation progress

A document explaining the general process and each chapter
Situation of policy area at the start of membership negotiations is according to the 2010 EC Opinion.
Timetable for screening meetings 2010–2011
The screening is a series of meetings between the commission and the applicant country examining the level of fulfilment of the EU acquis. It allows candidate countries to familiarise themselves with the acquis and it allows the Commission and the member States to evaluate the degree of preparedness of candidate countries prior to negotiations.

Political parties' stances

Public opinion
A poll released in January 2014 found that 67.5% of Icelanders support holding a referendum on the continuation of accession negotiations. On 22 February, the governing parties agreed to formally withdraw the membership application, without first holding a referendum on the matter, and submitted a bill to parliament seeking their approval to do so. The decision led to thousands of protesters taking to the streets outside of the Parliament buildings in Reykjavík. By 28 February 82% were in favour of holding the referendum. More than 40,000 people (16.5% of Iceland's voters) have signed a petition demanding that the promised referendum be held. On 25 February, Ragnheiður Ríkharðsdóttir, Chairman of the parliamentary group of the Independence Party, announced her intention not to vote in favour of the proposal. In early March, the EU ambassador to Iceland said that the country could keep its application suspended rather than having to decide between resuming negotiations or formally withdrawing the application, "but of course not for an unlimited period of time". The bill was not approved before parliament's summer recess.

Various polls have been taken on the public opinion of starting accession negotiations, joining the EU or adopting the euro.

Comparison with EU countries
If Iceland were admitted to the EU, it would be the smallest member state in terms of population. Its area (103,000 km2) is somewhat close to the average for EU countries (165,048 km2), but it would be the least densely populated country in the EU. The table below shows its population and population density in comparison to some of the other member states.

Iceland's GDP per capita is among the highest in Europe as is shown in the following tables:

The Icelandic language would be one of the official languages of the EU with the least speakers in terms of native speakers (together with Irish and Maltese).

Comparison to the EU and impact of joining

Diplomatic relations between Iceland and EU member states

See also 
Foreign relations of the European Union 
Foreign relations of Iceland
Icelandic European Union membership referendum
Greenland–European Union relations
Future enlargement of the European Union
Norway–European Union relations
Faroe Islands and the European Union
United Kingdom–European Union relations
Arctic policy of the European Union 
European Union–NATO relations

Further reading
 Baldur Thorhallsson. 2019. "Iceland and European Integration." in the Oxford Research Encyclopedia of Politics.

References

Notes

External links
Official websites
Iceland's application to the EU, Icelandic Ministry for Foreign Affairs
Icelandic mission to the EU, Icelandic Ministry for Foreign Affairs
European Union – Iceland relations, European External Action Service
European Union delegation to Iceland, European External Action Service
European Union – Icelandic trade relations, European Commission

News Portal
All related news on the Icelandic negotiations for EU membership , MBL

Lobbyist organisations
Iceland's EU Debate 
Evrópusamtökin, cross-political organisation of Icelandic EU supporters 
Evrópusamtökin, Euroblog 
Heimssýn, the cross-political organisation of Icelandic eurosceptics 
Icelandic Pro-EU membership website 
Icelandic Anti-EU Membership 
Yes-movement of Icelandic EU supporters  

 
Iceland
2009 in Europe
2009 in the European Union
2009 in Iceland
2009 in international relations